Movement Research is a non-profit organization that offers dance classes, workshops, residencies and performance opportunities for artists in New York City. Its focus is on improvisation, post-modern dance, and experimentation. It was founded in 1978 under the name “The School for Movement Research & Construction” and incorporated in 1980 after its first public performance in 1979. Movement Research organizes performances at the Judson Memorial Church among other locations around New York City. It has a long tie with Judson Church and Judson Dance Theater which shares some of the same base of artists.  In Spring 2018, Movement Research announced they will be occupying 3 spaces in the newly renovated 122 Community Center, making 122CC Movement Research's first permanent home in their 40 year history.

Initiatives
Among Movement Research's initiatives are a weekly dance practice at Judson Memorial Church, Open Performance, an open discussion moderated by a Movement Research Artist-in-Residence, Studies Project, a curated series of panels, and performances focused on a variety of issues, and the two-week Movement Research Festival that explores contemporary dance and the issues around it. 
They also host a series of low-cost classes led by dance artists; an artist in residence program known by the name AIR; and MRX, a traveling artist in residence program.

Publications
Movement Research has two publications: Performance Journal, a printed piece that focuses on current issues in performance; and Critical Correspondence, a web-based publication that includes interviews, experimental and scholarly writing, podcasts and video projects. "Critical Correspondence"  is currently edited by Amelia Bande and Tess Dworman.

Past participating dancers

Among dancers previously associated with Movement Research are: Trisha Brown, David Gordon, Ishmael Houston-Jones, Mårten Spångberg, Jennifer Monson, Mary Overlie, Zeena Parkins, Jennifer Lacey, Sarah Michelson, Will Rawls, Miguel Gutierrez, DD Dorvillier, and Simone Forti.

References

External links
Official site

Non-profit organizations based in New York City
Dance education
Organizations established in 1978
Performance art venues
Performance art in New York City
1978 establishments in New York City